Adar Friedmann (Hebrew: אדר פרידמן; born 18 July 2006) is an Israeli rhythmic gymnast. She won gold in the group All-Around at the 2022 European Championship and silver in the same category at the 2022 World Championships.

Personal life 
Friedmann took up gymnastics at age seven, she stated that: "personally, I have always loved gymnastics. Not everyone can reach a high level, it's very special". Adar's main ambition is to compete at the 2024 Olympic Games. Her idol is Israeli rhythmic gymnast Linoy Ashram.

Career 
In 2022 Friedmann was named part of Israel's new national group, training for most of the day, which is more than 10 hours, thinking that they have to go to training and work harder than yesterday. They debuted at the World Cup in Athens, winning gold in 5 hoops and 3 ribbons + 2 balls. Then Baku, where they got bronze in the All-Around and 5 hoops. Pamplona (All-Around silver), Portimão (All-Around gold) and Cluj-Napoca (All-Around and 5 hoops silver).

In June she participated in the European Championships in Tel Aviv, where the group won the All-Around and got silver with 5 hoops as well as the bronze medal in the senior team category along with teammates Shani Bakanov, Amit Hedvat, Romi Paritzki, Ofir Shaham, Diana Svertsov and the individuals Daria Atamanov and Adi Asya Katz.

In September Shani took part in the World Championships in Sofia along Shani Bakanov, Romi Paritzki, Ofir Shaham and Diana Svertsov, winning two silver medals in the All-Around and the 5 hoops' final. Despite being among the favourites for a team medal, Israel couldn't take part in the competition because Atamanov broke her foot the day before the competition started and, as replacements had to be announced at least 24 hours before competition, leaving the country with only Katz as individual.

References 

2006 births
Living people
Israeli rhythmic gymnasts
Medalists at the Rhythmic Gymnastics European Championships
Medalists at the Rhythmic Gymnastics World Championships